In music, 15 equal temperament, called 15-TET, 15-EDO, or 15-ET, is a tempered scale derived by dividing the octave into 15 equal steps (equal frequency ratios). Because 15 factors into 3 times 5, it can be seen as being made up of three scales of 5 equal divisions of the octave, each of which resembles the Slendro scale in Indonesian gamelan. 15 equal temperament is not a meantone system.

History and use

Guitars have been constructed for 15-ET tuning.  The American musician Wendy Carlos used 15-ET as one of two scales in the track Afterlife from the album Tales of Heaven and Hell.  Easley Blackwood, Jr. has written and recorded a suite for 15-ET guitar. Blackwood believes that 15 equal temperament, "is likely to bring about a considerable enrichment of both classical and popular repertoire in a variety of styles".

Notation
Easley Blackwood, Jr.'s notation of 15-EDO creates this chromatic scale:

B/C, C/D, D, D, E, E, E/F, F/G, G, G, A, A, A, B, B, B/C

An alternate form of notation, which is sometimes called "Porcupine Notation," can be used. It yields the following chromatic scale:

C, C/D, D, D/E, E, E/F, F, F/G, G, G, A, A, A/B, B, B, C

A notation that uses the numerals is also possible, in which each chain of fifths is notated either by the odd numbers, the even numbers, or with accidentals.

1, 1/2, 2, 3, 3/4, 4, 5, 5/6, 6, 7, 7/8, 8, 9, 9/0, 0, 1

In this article, unless specified otherwise, Blackwood's notation will be used.

Interval size
Here are the sizes of some common intervals in 15-ET:

15-ET matches the 7th and 11th harmonics well, but only matches the 3rd and 5th harmonics roughly.  The perfect fifth is more out of tune than in 12-ET, 19-ET, or 22-ET, and the major third in 15-ET is the same as the major third in 12-ET, but the other intervals matched are more in tune (except for the septimal tritones).  15-ET is the smallest tuning that matches the 11th harmonic at all and still has a usable perfect fifth, but its match to intervals utilizing the 11th harmonic is poorer than 22-ET, which also has more in-tune fifths and major thirds.

Although it contains a perfect fifth as well as major and minor thirds, the remainder of the harmonic and melodic language of 15-ET is quite different from 12-ET, and thus 15-ET could be described as xenharmonic.  Unlike 12-ET and 19-ET, 15-ET matches the 11:8 and 16:11 ratios.  15-ET also has a neutral second and septimal whole tone. To construct a major third in 15-ET, one must stack two intervals of different sizes, whereas one can divide both the minor third and perfect fourth into two equal intervals.

References

External links 
 Ivor Darreg, "15-TONE SCALE SYSTEM" (1991), Sonic-Arts.org.
 Brewt: "Fifteen note equal temperament tutorial".
 Noah Jordan: "The Devil" (piano work).
 Claudi Meneghin: "Tocada" (for Two Organs).

Equal temperaments
Microtonality